New Athens High School is a public high school located in New Athens, Illinois.

Athletics
New Athens High School athletics teams compete in the Cahokia Conference in the Kaskaskia Division. Their school colors are gold and purple and their mascot is the yellow jacket. They offer baseball, softball, boys & girls basketball, volleyball, cross country, boys & girls golf, and track & field.

State championships 

 Baseball
 1979 Illinois High School Association State Champions

Demographics
As of the 2018–2019 school year, New Athens High School enrolled 149 students. 142 identified as white, four identified as black, and one identified as multi-racial.

Notable alumni
Whitey Herzog, former Major League Baseball player and manager

References

External links

Public high schools in Illinois
Schools in St. Clair County, Illinois